The Basharat Mosque (the name means “good news”) or Masjid Basharat is a mosque in Pedro Abad, Córdoba, Spain. The foundation stone was laid by the then head of worldwide Ahmadiyya Muslim Community, Mirza Nasir Ahmad on October 9, 1980. It is the first purpose-built mosque since the end of Muslim rule at the end of the 15th century. It was inaugurated on 10 September 1982 by the fourth head of Ahmadiyya Muslim Community, Mirza Tahir Ahmad. The mosque is the centre of Ahmadiyya-Movement in Spain.

The annual gathering of the Ahmadiyya Muslim Community in Spain (Jalsa Salana) is celebrated in Pedro Abad.

See also
Islam in Spain
List of mosques in Europe

References

External links
Ahmadiyya Muslim Community in Spain (Spanish)
Jalsa Salana in Spain (with picture of the Mosque)
Biography of Mirza Tahir Ahmad
panoramio.com: Basharat Mosque, Pedro Abad, Mezquita Basharat

Ahmadiyya mosques in Spain
Mosques completed in 1982
1982 establishments in Spain